James Blair Jr. served as mayor of Williamsburg, Virginia from 1769 to 1770.

Mayors of Williamsburg, Virginia